Isesi-ankh (transliteration Izzi-ˁnḫ)  was an ancient Egyptian high official during the second half of the Fifth Dynasty, in the late 25th to mid 24th century BC. His name means "Isesi lives". He may have been a son of pharaoh Djedkare Isesi and queen Meresankh IV, although this is debated. Isesi-ankh probably lived during the reign of Djedkare Isesi and that of his successor Unas. He was buried in a mastaba tomb in north Saqqara, now ruined.

Filiation

Isesi-ankh may have been a son of Djedkare Isesi, as suggested by his name and his title of King's son. In addition, similarities in the titles and locations of the tombs of Isesi-ankh and Kaemtjenent have led Egyptologists such as William Stevenson Smith to propose that the two were brothers and sons of Meresankh IV. Alternatively, Isesi-ankh may have been a son of Kaemtjenent.

Even though Isesi-ankh bore the title of King's son, the Egyptologists Michel Baud and Bettina Schmitz have shown that this filiation was probably fictitious, being used only as an honorary title. In particular, inscriptions found on the construction blocks of his mastaba give one of his titles as Seal bearer of the king Isesi ankh, while Baud argues that had he really been the son of a king, this title would have been Seal bearer of the king, king's son, Isesi ankh. Consequently, Isesi-ankh's father was likely not Djedkare Isesi.

Titles

Isesi-ankh bore many titles showing that he made a successful career as a high official:
Overseer of all the works of the King, 
Overseer of the expedition/troops, 
Overseer of all judgements of the King, 
Shepherd of the livestock, 
Staff of the recruits, 
Chief of the royal secrets, 
Seal bearer of the God in the Two Great Barks, 
Seal bearer of the God,
Director of the bark of Horus,
King's son, 
Sole companion.

Tomb
Isesi-ankh was buried in mastaba D8, north of the Pyramid of Djoser in Saqqara. The mastaba was first investigated in the 19th century by Auguste Mariette, and again briefly during the excavation season 1907–1908 of James Quibell. More extensive work took place under the direction of Said Amer El-Fikey in 1983, then director of the archaeological zone of Saqqarah. The excavations yielded two demotic papyri. A decade later, in 1994, the remaining decorations of the mastaba were studied under the direction of Yvonne Harpur, Field Director of the Oxford Expedition to Egypt. The structure is now in a ruined state and many of its reliefs and decorations are lost. 
 
The mastaba comprised a recessed facade with two columns. The architrave above the entrance and the two columns were inscribed with Isesi-ankh's titles, which are now damaged. At the back of the facade, a corridor leads to two rooms, one of which further leads to a cult chapel in the back, where the false door stela of Isesi-ankh was located. This false door, made of poor-quality marl, bears inscriptions that are better preserved than on the facade. These as well as the other reliefs on the false door were originally painted with a green enamel and the walls of the tomb were adorned with paintings on plaster, much of which have now disappeared although the green coloring has persisted.

Notes

References

Bibliography 

Princes of the Fifth Dynasty of Egypt